Plinthocoelium suaveolens is a species of beetles in the family Cerambycidae. It was described by Carl Linnaeus in 1768. It contains the subspecies Plinthocoelium suaveolens suaveolens and Plinthocoelium suaveolens plicatum.

References

Callichromatini
Beetles described in 1768
Taxa named by Carl Linnaeus